Adam Wojciech Burakowski (born 26 July 1977 in Warsaw) is a Polish diplomat, political scientist and historian, since December 2017 serving as an ambassador of Poland to India.

Life 
Adam Burakowski graduated from University of Warsaw Faculty of History (2001). In 2007 he defended his PhD thesis on Nicolae Ceaușescu (supervised by Andrzej Paczkowski) and, in 2015, habilitation on politics of Romania. He is the professor of the Institute of Political Studies of the Polish Academy of Sciences. Graduate of the Maharaja Jam Saheb Digvijay Sinhji High School.

From 2006 to 2017 he worked for the national broadcaster Polskie Radio, holding various positions related to the international affairs. He was a Polish representative to the European Broadcasting Union. Simultaneously, he was involved in the Euranet. At that time he has been cooperating with Centre for European Studies of Jawaharlal Nehru University, Universitatea Babeș-Bolyai Cluj-Napoca, Masaryk University in Brno.

In December 2017 he became the Republic of Poland Ambassador to India. He is accredited to six other countries, i.e. Afghanistan, Bangladesh, Bhutan, Maldives, Nepal, Sri Lanka.

He speaks English, Hindi, Romanian and Russian. He is married and has four children.

Works 

 Europeizacja partii politycznych i grup interesu w krajach Partnerstwa Wschodniego i kandydujących do Unii Europejskiej, Warszawa, 2015 (with Jakub Wódka and Agnieszka K. Cianciara).
 System polityczny współczesnej Rumunii, Warszawa 2014
 Indie: od kolonii do mocarstwa 1857–2013, Warszawa,  2013 (with Krzysztof Iwanek)
 Geniusz Karpat. Dyktatura Nicolae Ceaușescu 1965–1989, Warszawa 2009
 1989 – Jesień Narodów, Warszawa 2010 (with Aleksander Gubrynowicz, Paweł Ukielski)
 Kraj smutny pełen humoru. Dzieje Rumunii po 1989 roku, Warszawa 2012 (with Marius Stan)
 System polityczny współczesnej Rumunii, Warszawa-Kraków 2014

References 

1977 births
Ambassadors of Poland to India
Living people
Diplomats from Warsaw
Academic staff of the Polish Academy of Sciences
21st-century Polish historians
Polish male non-fiction writers
Polish political scientists
University of Warsaw alumni